Stanley Peak is a central summit in the Wilckens Peaks, rising to 1,265 m at the head of Fortuna Glacier, South Georgia. It was named by the UK Antarctic Place-Names Committee (UK-APC) after Lieutenant Commander (later Cdr.) Ian Stanley, Royal Navy, a helicopter pilot from HMS Antrim, who carried out a rescue operation in bad weather after two helicopters had crashed on Fortuna Glacier, 21 April 1982.

Mountains and hills of South Georgia
Falklands War in South Georgia